On the Move is a live album by Nat Adderley's Quintet recorded in 1982 and released on the Theresa label.

Reception

The Penguin Guide to Jazz states "The group as a whole is very strong and while there may be quibbles about the sound quality ... there are none whatsoever about the music". In his review for AllMusic, Ron Wynn stated "neither Adderley nor pianist Larry Willis, who supplied half the date's songs, were in top form. Willis played some nice melodies but did not offer much during his solos, while Adderley was plagued by sloppy articulation. However, the work of Fortune, who has not recorded nearly often enough, salvages things somewhat".

Track listing
All compositions by Nat Adderley except as indicated
 "Malandro" (Larry Willis) - 12:11    
 "The Boy With the Sad Eyes" - 7:57    
 "To Wisdom the Prize" (Willis) - 10:14    
 "Naturally" - 7:00    
 "The Scene" - 4:34    
 "Come in out of the Rain" (Willis) - 14:30 Bonus track on CD reissue

Personnel
Nat Adderley - cornet
Sonny Fortune - alto saxophone
Larry Willis - piano
Walter Booker - bass
Jimmy Cobb - drums

References

1983 live albums
Nat Adderley live albums
Theresa Records live albums
Albums recorded at Keystone Korner